College of Communication may refer to:

Diederich College of Communication at Marquette University
P.U.P. College of Communication of the Polytechnic University of the Philippines
 London College of Communication, formerly the London College of Printing, and briefly London College of Printing and Distributive Trades
 Edward R. Murrow College of Communication of Washington State University
 Boston University College of Communication
 University of Texas at Austin College of Communication
 Penn State College of Communications of Pennsylvania State University, USA

It may also refer to:

 Ravensbourne College of Design and Communication in the United Kingdom
 UPLB College of Development Communication of the University of the Philippines Los Baños
 Budapest College of Communication and Business in Hungary
 Florida State University School of Communication a School within the College of Communication and Information
 College of Mass Communication & Media Arts at Southern Illinois University Carbondale, USA
 Henry W. Grady College of Journalism and Mass Communication of the University of Georgia, USA
 Gaylord College of Journalism and Mass Communication of the University of Oklahoma
 Towson University College of Fine Arts and Communication